2021 in the Philippines details events of note that have occurred in the Philippines in 2021. The COVID-19 pandemic, which largely defined 2020, continued into 2021.

Incumbents

 President: Rodrigo Duterte (PDP–Laban)
 Vice President: Leni Robredo (Liberal)
 Congress (18th):
 Senate President: Tito Sotto (NPC)
 House Speaker: Lord Allan Velasco (PDP–Laban)
 Chief Justice:
 Diosdado Peralta (until March 27)
 Estela Perlas-Bernabe (acting), (March 27 – April 5)
 Alexander Gesmundo (from April 5)

Ongoing events
 COVID-19 pandemic
 Pharmally scandal (from July)
 2021 Quincentennial Commemorations in the Philippines, which includes the 500th anniversaries of the introduction of Christianity in the Philippines, the Philippines' part in Magellan's circumnavigation of the world, and the victory of Lapulapu's forces in the Battle of Mactan.

Events

January
 January 4 – President Rodrigo Duterte signs Republic Act No. 11510, institutionalizing the alternative learning system (ALS).
 January 18 – The Department of National Defense announces its unilateral termination of its 1989 accord with the University of the Philippines which took effect three days earlier over claims that the New People's Army is recruiting members in the universities' campuses. The agreement limited the entry of police and military of the national government in the University of the Philippines' campuses.

February
 February 5 – Businesswoman Janet Lim-Napoles, former Cagayan de Oro representative Constantino Jaraula, and three others are convicted by the Sandiganbayan of graft and malversation of public funds, in relation to the Priority Development Assistance Fund scam.
 February 7: – 2021 Davao Del Sur earthquake: A 6.0  earthquake struck the southern island of Mindanao, injuring 14 and causing damage.
 February 16:
 The Supreme Court, sitting as the Presidential Electoral Tribunal, unanimously dismisses the electoral protest of defeated vice presidential candidate and former senator Bongbong Marcos against Vice President Leni Robredo.
 President Rodrigo Duterte grants amnesty to members of rebel groups Moro National Liberation Front, Moro Islamic Liberation Front, and the Rebolusyonaryong Partido ng Manggagawa ng Pilipinas/Revolutionary Proletarian Army/Alex Boncayao Brigade who have committed crimes in pursuit of their political beliefs, and who would agree to surrender their weapons.
 February 17 – Senator Leila de Lima is acquitted, due to insufficient evidence, in one of the three drug cases filed against her.
 February 26 – President Rodrigo Duterte signs Republic Act No. 11524, creating a trust fund for the country's coconut farmers.
 February 28 – The Philippines receives its first shipment of COVID-19 vaccines, with the arrival of 600,000 doses of China-based drugmaker Sinovac Biotech vaccine CoronaVac.

March
 March 1 – The Department of Health and National Task Force Against COVID-19 start its vaccination campaign with 600,000 doses of donated COVID-19 vaccines from Sinovac. Philippine General Hospital director Gerardo Legaspi becomes the first person in the country to be legally inoculated with CoronaVac.
 March 13 – Residents of Palawan, except Puerto Princesa, vote in a plebiscite to disapprove a law that would divide Palawan into three separate provinces.
 March 21 – The Philippines files its first formal diplomatic protest with regard to the presence of about 220 Chinese fishing boats moored at Whitsun Reef in the Spratly Islands as early as March 7. The incident at Whitsun Reef caused diplomatic tensions between China and the Philippines with the latter suspecting the ships to be part of a militia and that China plans to use the ship to secure control over the disputed reef.
 March 27 – President Rodrigo Duterte approves the IATF's recommendation to place the Greater Manila Area under enhanced community quarantine from March 29 to April 4, later it was extended until April 11.

April
 April 30 – PhiSys becomes available for online registration. PSA receives more than 40,000 registration request on the first minutes of the pilot launch.

May
 May 8 – The Bangsamoro Islamic Freedom Fighters insurgents occupied the public market of the municipality of Datu Paglas in Maguindanao.
 May 11 – President Duterte places the Philippines under a state of calamity for a period of one year due to the African swine fever (ASF) outbreak.
 May 14 – The Philippine government through the Anti-Terrorism Council formally declares CPP-NPA leader Joma Sison including 18 others and ASG leader Esmael Abdul-malik including nine others as terrorists in its resolution dated April 21.
 May 27:
 Republic Act 11550 is signed into law, approving the province of Maguindanao to be split into two provinces: Maguindanao del Norte and Maguindanao del Sur. Once ratification is approved in a future plebiscite, the province of Maguindanao will be dissolved.
 President Rodrigo Duterte signs Republic Act No. 11521, extending the electricity lifeline rates for the poor for a period of 50 years.

July
 July 4 – A Lockheed C-130 Hercules aircraft of the Philippine Air Force (PAF) crashes in Patikul, Sulu, killing 53 people. The incident is the deadliest aviation accident involving the Philippine military.
 July 30 – President Rodrigo Duterte revokes his order to terminate the Philippines' Visiting Forces Agreement with the United States. The termination process was initiated in February 2020 by notifying the United States. The termination was to take effect after six months but was pushed back multiple times.

August
 August 16 – A daylong encounter between soldiers of the Armed Forces of the Philippines and members of the New People's Army in the latter's lair in Dolores, Eastern Samar results in deaths of at least 19 rebels.

October
 October 3 – The International Consortium of Investigative Journalists and assorted media partners publish a set of 11.9 million documents leaked from 14 financial services companies known as the Pandora Papers, revealing offshore financial activities which listed several current and former Philippine officials and personalities that included Secretary of Transportation Arthur Tugade and former COMELEC Chairman Andres D. Bautista.
 October 8 – Journalist Maria Ressa, the founder and chief executive officer of the online news website Rappler, is awarded the 2021 Nobel Peace Prize by the Norwegian Nobel Committee, along with Russian journalist Dmitry Muratov, "for their efforts to safeguard the freedom of expression" with regards to freedom of the press. Ressa is the first individual Filipino Nobel Prize laureate and the first Filipino Nobel Peace Prize laureate.
October 12 – The Antipolo Regional Trial Court convicts three members of the Reform the Armed Forces Movement for the killing of labor leader Rolando Olalia and unionist Leonor Alay-ay.

December
 December 10 – President Duterte signs Republic Act 11596 into law, criminalizing child marriage in the Philippines.
 December 16–18 – Typhoon Rai (Odette) makes landfall in southern Philippines causing at least 407 deaths and  worth of damage to infrastructure and agriculture. Pres. Duterte declares a state of calamity in six regions on December 21 as a response to the typhoon's impact.
 December 31 – Republic Act 11641 is signed into law which creates the Department of Migrant Workers (DMW) for  Overseas Filipino Worker (OFWs). The department reorganizes Philippine Overseas Employment Administration, the Department of Labor and Employment's International Labor Affairs Bureau and all Overseas Labor Offices, the National Reintegration Center for OFWs, and the National Maritime Polytechnic.

Holidays

On July 31, 2020, the government announced at least 18 Philippine holidays for 2021 as declared by virtue of Proclamation No. 986, series of 2020. On February 26, 2021, in an effort to stimulate economic recovery in the wake of the COVID-19 pandemic, President Duterte signed Proclamation No. 1107 reducing the number of special non-working holidays and declaring November 2, December 24, and December 31 as "special working days" instead. Note that in the list, holidays in italics are "special non-working holidays," those in bold are "regular holidays," and those in non-italics and non-bold are "special holidays for schools."

In addition, several other places observe local holidays, such as the foundation of their town. These are also "special days."

 January 1 – New Year's Day
 February 12 – Chinese New Year
 February 25 – 1986 EDSA Revolution
 April 1 – Maundy Thursday
 April 2 – Good Friday
 April 3 – Black Saturday
 April 9 – Araw ng Kagitingan (Day of Valor)
 May 1 – Labor Day
 May 13 – Eid'l Fitr (Feast of Ramadan)
 June 12 – Independence Day
 July 20 – Eid'l Adha (Feast of Sacrifice)
 August 21 – Ninoy Aquino Day
 August 30 – National Heroes Day
 November 1 – All Saints Day
 November 2 – Special working holiday
 November 30 – Bonifacio Day
 December 8 – Feast of the Immaculate Conception
 December 24 – Special working holiday
 December 25 – Christmas Day
 December 30 – Rizal Day
 December 31 – Special working holiday (in observance of New Year's Eve celebrations)

Business and economy

 January 7 – The Security and Exchange Commission announces that it allows Investree to commence commercial operations. The firm becomes the first crowdfunding portal to be allowed to operate from the Philippines.
 January 28 – The Philippine Statistics Authority announces that the country's GDP contracted by 9.5% in 2020, the biggest GDP contraction since World War II.
 March 8 – Dito Telecommunity commences commercial operations in selected cities in Visayas and Mindanao, entering the country's telecommunications industry.
 March 25 – The Overseas Filipino Bank is given the first digital-only bank license in the Philippines, by the Monetary Board of the Bangko Sentral ng Pilipinas, the country's central bank.
 May 26 – Monde Nissin makes the largest initial public offering in the Philippines announcing that it has raised  in its debut in the Philippine Stock Exchange. The IPO was filed on March 4.

Entertainment and culture

 March 27 – Samantha Bernardo wins the title of 1st runner-up in the Miss Grand International 2020 pageant which was held in Bangkok, Thailand.
 April 5 – Kelley Day wins the title of 1st runner-up in the Miss Eco International 2020 pageant which was held in Egypt.
 May 17 – Rabiya Mateo finishes in the Top 21 at Miss Universe 2020 in Florida, USA.
 July 11 – Hannah Arnold wins Miss International Philippines 2021, Samantha Alexandra Panlilio wins Miss Grand International Philippines 2021, Cinderella Faye Obenita wins Miss Intercontinental Philippines 2021, and Maureen Montagne wins Globe Philippines 2021.
 August 8 – Naelah Alshorbaji wins Miss Philippines Earth 2021 via virtual coronation. She represents the Philippines at Miss Earth 2021 on November 21.
 August 21 – Dindi Pajares finishes in the Top 12 at Miss Supranational 2021 in Malopolska, Poland.
 September 30 – Beatrice Gomez of Cebu City wins Miss Universe Philippines 2021 and represents the Philippines at Miss Universe 2021 on December 13. Gomez is the first openly lesbian to win the pageant.

Sports

 January 25 – Volleyball: An election is held to determine the set of officials to head the Philippine National Volleyball Federation, a new national sports association (NSA) for volleyball formed in a bid to end the dispute between the Philippine Volleyball Federation and the Larong Volleyball sa Pilipinas over which organization is the legitimate NSA for volleyball in the country.
 August 8 – The Philippine Olympic delegation finishes 2020 Summer Olympics campaign with 50th overall leaderboard after won 1 gold, 2 silver, and 1 bronze medal. The biggest haul in the country's history in the Games and the top ranking in Southeast Asia.

Deaths

January 
 January 1:
 Christine Dacera (b. 1997), flight attendant of PAL Express
 January 2: 
 Nonoy Chuatico (b. 1965), former basketball player
 Rogelio Casurao (b. 1954), vice chairman and executive officer of National Police Commission
 January 6:
 Danilo Lim (b. 1955), chairman of the Metro Manila Development Authority
 Pag-asa (b. 1992), first Philippine eagle to be bred and hatched in captivity
 January 7 – Reynaldo Umali (b. 1957), former representative of Oriental Mindoro's 2nd congressional district
 January 9 – Royette Padilla (b. 1962), former actor
 January 10:
 Joji Aragon, undersecretary of Department of Labor and Employment
 Alberto "Bert" Ortiz (b. 1959), former basketball player
 Moe Chulani (b. 1975), co-founder and project director of Ronda Pilipinas
 January 11 – Christopher Cuan, mayor of Libungan, Cotabato
 January 20 – Abdul Sahrin, Deputy Chief Minister of Bangsamoro
 January 23 – Tony Ferrer (b. 1934), former actor
 January 26 – Yabing Masalon Dulo (b. 1914), weaver and Manlilikha ng Bayan awardee
 January 29 – Dante Jimenez (b. 1952), chairman of Presidential Anti-Corruption Commission
 January 31 – Victor Ziga (b. 1945), former senator, Albay assemblyman and cabinet minister

February 
 February 1 – Naty Crame-Rogers (b. 1922), actress
 February 2 – John Henry Osmeña (b. 1935), former senator
 February 9 – James Gordon Jr. (b. 1947), former representative of Zambales's 1st congressional district and mayor of Olongapo
 February 10:
Rodolfo Garcia (b. 1944), general manager of MRT Line 3
Eli Soriano (b. 1947), preacher and international televangelist
 February 17 – Jacinto Cayco (b. 1924), swimmer and referee
 February 19 – Vincent Arboleda (b. 1987), UNTV News reporter
 February 23 – Raul de Sagon, mayor of Itbayat, Batanes
 February 24 – Ayong Maliksi (b. 1938), former governor of Cavite and mayor of Imus, Cavite
 February 25 – Jose R. Gullas (b. 1934), former representative of Cebu's 1st congressional district
 February 26:
 Restituto Calonge, vice mayor of Mabuhay, Zamboanga Sibugay
 Tarhata Alonto-Lucman (b. 1926), first woman governor of Lanao del Sur

March 
 March 2 – Hazel Rivero (b. 1988), UNTV News reporter
 March 3 – Rocky Gathercole (b. 1966), fashion designer
 March 6:
 Joaquin Bernas (b. 1932), Jesuit lawyer, professor and writer; member of the 1986 Constitutional Commission, former president of the Ateneo de Manila University
 Ben Farrales (b. 1932), fashion designer
 March 8 – Ronaldo Aquino (b. 1961), mayor of Calbayog, Samar
 March 11 – Cecilio Hernandez (b. 1952), former mayor of Rodriguez, Rizal
 March 16 – Laura Hermosa (b. 1928), actress, radio voice talent and mother of Tessie Tomas
 March 20 – Fidelis Atienza (b. 1918), nun and propagator of Good Shepherd ube jam
 March 27 – Antonio Sanchez (b. 1949), former mayor of Calauan, Laguna; convicted for the murders of Eileen Sarmenta and Allan Gomez
 March 28 – Edwin Pangilinan, mayor of Famy, Laguna
 March 29 – Cesar Sulibit, former mayor of Liliw, Laguna
 March 30 – Claire dela Fuente (b. 1958), businesswoman and singer

April
 April 2 – Arielle Agasang (b. 1969), fashion designer
 April 4 – Eduardo Dimacuha (b. 1943), former mayor of Batangas City
 April 6 – Nestor Torre (b. 1942), film writer, director and journalist
 April 8 – Mildred Ortega (b. 1953), former actress
 April 9 – Totoy Talastas (b. 1928), radio and television broadcaster
 April 12:
Santiago Albano Pilar, (b. 1946), Art historian and writer
Vicente Vinarao, former director general of Bureau of Corrections
 Joselito "Joey" Ocampo (b. 1952), former basketball player
 April 15 – Adelino Sitoy (b. 1936), former mayor of Cordova, Cebu and Presidential Legislative Liaison Office Secretary
 April 18 – Ludovico Badoy (b. 1951), former mayor of Cotabato City and executive director of National Historical Commission of the Philippines
 April 22:
 Wencelito Andanar (b. 1948), former undersecretary of Department of the Interior and Local Government and special envoy to Malaysia
 Edwin Sevidal (b. 1971), DZMM field reporter
 April 23 – Victor Wood (b. 1946), singer
 April 25 – Genebert Basadre (b. 1984), boxer and SEA Games gold medalist
 April 26 – Mike Ochosa (b. 1965), sports analyst, writer, and entrepreneur
 April 27 – Toto Natividad (b. 1957), film and television director
 April 28 – Celso Dayrit (b. 1951), former president of the Philippine Olympic Committee and the International Fencing Federation

May
 May 2:
 Dominador Cepeda, former chairman of Games and Amusements Board
 Richard "Le Chazz" Yuzon (b. 1977), stand-up comedian and former Wowowin host
 May 4 – Ricky Lo (b. 1946), entertainment columnist
 May 13 – Ruben Ecleo, Jr., former Dinagat Islands representative and murder convict
 May 17 – Kabang (b. 2008), hero dog
 May 20 – Zion Aquino (b. 1979), musician
 May 21 – Andrew Gotianun Jr. (b. c. 1952), vice chairman of Filinvest Land
 May 23 – Baby Barredo (b. 1941), theater actress and producer, co-founder of Repertory Philippines
 May 26 – Arturo Luz (b. 1926), painter, sculptor and printmaker, National Artist of the Philippines
 May 28 – Resurreccion Acop (b. 1947), representative of Antipolo's 2nd congressional district
 May 30:
 Alan Gel Cordova (b. 1968), vice mayor of Dumaguete
 Maria Amelita Villarosa (b. 1943), former Deputy Speaker of the House of Representatives and representative of Occidental Mindoro's at-large congressional district
 May 31 – Ester Chavez (b. 1927), actress

June
 June 3 – Arlene Tolibas (b. 1965), actress and director
 June 4 – Yentez Quintoy (b. 1981), Executive Secretary of (Brigada Group of Companies)
 June 6 – Kieth Absalon (b. 2000), football player (FEU Tamaraws, national under-19 football team)
 June 7 – Augusto Salvador (b. 1940), film director and editor
 June 10 – Douglas Cagas (b. 1943), governor of Davao del Sur and former member of the Davao del Sur's at-large congressional district
 June 23 – Shalala (b. 1960), radio-television personality and comedian
 June 24 – Benigno Aquino III (b. 1960), 15th President of the Philippines (2010–2016), former senator (2007–2010) and former member of the Tarlac's 2nd congressional district (1998–2007)

July
 July 6 – Bienvenido Tantoco Sr. (b. 1921), founder of Rustan Group of Companies and former Philippine Ambassador to the Holy See
 July 7 – Nonoy Espina (b. 1962), journalist, media rights advocate, and former chair of the National Union of Journalists of the Philippines
 July 11 – Jeci Lapus (b. 1953), former chief of Local Water Utilities Administration and former representative of Tarlac's 3rd congressional district
 July 12:
 Celia Diaz Laurel (b. 1928), theater actress
 Zeneida Quezon Avanceña (b. 1921), rights advocate and daughter of President Manuel L. Quezon
 July 13 – Angel Cacnio (b. 1931), painter, visual designer, and designer of Philippines' 20-peso and 100-peso bills
 July 14 – Hans Mortel (b. 1972), comedian and TV host
 July 15 – Cesar Malapitan (b. 1960), Premier Volleyball League head of operations
 July 16 – Neil Doloricon (b. 1957) painter, printmaker, and editorial cartoonist
 July 19 – Lito Osmeña (b. 1938), former governor of Cebu (1988–1992)
 July 23:
 Buddy Gomez (b. 1935), former press secretary
 Wally Gonzalez (b. 1950), Juan de la Cruz Band guitarist
 July 24
 Elly Pamatong (b. 1943), former presidential aspirant
 Fr. Roger I. Tamares, SDB (b. 1964) - Parish Priest of St. John Bosco Parish and Center for Young Workers, Santa Rosa, Laguna, (2016-); Parish Priest of Mary Help of Christians Parish, Mayapa, Calamba, Laguna (2010-2016); Parish Priest of St. Dominic Savio Parish, Mandaluyong City (2001-2006)
 July 25 – Joseph Israel Laban (b. 1971) filmmaker and journalist
 July 26 – Marvin "Ate Shawee" Martinez (b. 1976), impersonator, stand-up comedian and TV personality
 July 27 – Orestes Ojeda (b. 1956), actor
 July 29 – Domingo Landicho (b. 1939), writer and playwright
 July 30 – Manuel Morato (b. 1933), former chair of MTRCB and board of director of Philippine Charity Sweepstakes Office
 July 31:
 Arlene Sinsuat-de Castro (b. 1955), former ABS-CBN Vice President for News, Bayan Productions, Inc. founder
 Herminio Aquino (b. 1949), former representative of Tarlac's 3rd congressional district

August
 August 4:
Kitchie Benedicto (b. 1947), veteran producer and TV director
Riel Hilario (b. 1969), artist, sculptor and cultural worker
Clarence Paul Oaminal (b. 1960), former vice chairman of Dangerous Drugs Board
 August 12:
Jose P. Perez (b. 1946), former Associate Justice of the Supreme Court of the Philippines
Haydée Coloso-Espino (b. 1937), swimmer
 August 14 – Virginia R. Moreno (b. 1923), writer
 August 15:
Roque Ferriols (b. 1924), philosopher
Mohammad Zainoden Bato (b. 1945), Moro Islamic Liberation Front and Bangsamoro Parliament member
 August 17 – Jun del Rosario (b. 1959), journalist
 August 18: 
Jose Abueva (b. 1928), former President of the University of the Philippines
 Pablo P. Garcia (b. 1925), former governor of Cebu (1995–2004)
 August 20:
Vergel "Nene" Aguilar (b. 1947), former mayor of Las Piñas (1995–2004, 2007–16)
Kerima Lorena Tariman (b. 1979), poet, activist, and rebel; former editor at the Philippine Collegian
 August 22 – Dionisio Cañete (b. 1938), arnis and eskrima practitioner
 August 24 – Nelly Restar (b. 1939), sprinter
 August 26 – Rafael Hechanova (b. 1928), former basketball player
 August 27 – Priscilla Baltazar-Padilla (b. 1958), former Associate Justice of the Supreme Court of the Philippines
 August 31:
Noemi "Mahal" Tesorero (b. 1974), comedian
Reuben Lista (b. 1947), Philippine National Oil Company president and former commandant of the Philippine Coast Guard

September
 September 1 – Leopoldo Serantes (b. 1962), bronze-medalist Olympic boxer
 September 2 – Josephine Medina (b. 1970), bronze-medalist Paralympic table tennis player
 September 3 – Nestor Soriano (b. 1953), sailor
 September 4:
 Raymund Isaac (b. 1962), celebrity photographer
 Lyan Suiza (b. 1973), television director
 September 8 – Luis Villafuerte (b. 1935), former governor of Camarines Sur
 September 13:
 Rafa Dinglasan (b. 1968), professional basketball player and coach
 Ruben T. Reyes (b. 1939), former Associate Justice of the Supreme Court of the Philippines
 September 15 – Renee "Alon" dela Rosa (b. 1959), singer-songwriter
 September 16:
 Emil L. Ong (b. 1937), former representative of Northern Samar's 2nd congressional district
 Ramon Y. Sy (b. 1930), former president and chief executive officer of United Coconut Planters Bank and International Exchange Bank
 September 17 – Delfin M. Wenceslao Jr. (b. 1953), chairman of DM Wenceslao & Associates
 September 18: 
Roberto Rafael V. Lucila (b. 1956), corporate officer of GMA Network
Bree Jonson (b. 1991), painter
 September 19 – Dinky Soliman (b. 1953), former Secretary of Social Welfare and Development
 September 20 – Ronald Donald "Bob" Couttie (b. 1930), historian, independent scholar, author and journalist
 September 22:
 Criselda Lontok (b. 1940), fashion designer
 Mauricio "Moying" Martelino (b. 1935), former secretary-general of the Asian Basketball Confederation and chairman of the Philippine Volleyball Federation
 September 23:
 Janet Bordon (b. 1960), actress
 Ely "Mr. Cariñoso" Cruz Ramirez (b. 1933), radio announcer
 September 24 – Jerome Yenson (b. 1996), baseball player (Adamson Soaring Falcons, Philippines national baseball team)
 September 26 – Oscar "Oca" Garin (b. 1941), former mayor of Guimbal, Iloilo and representative of Iloilo's 1st congressional district
 September 28 – Bienvenido Lumbera (b. 1932), poet, critic, dramatist, National Artist of the Philippines and recipient Ramon Magsaysay Award for Journalism, Literature and Creative Communications
 September 30:
Adelina Santos Rodriguez (b. 1920), former mayor of Quezon City
Leticia Gempisao (b. 1952) softball player

October
 October 2:
 Leo Obligar (b. 1938), radio and television broadcaster
 Leticia "Lolita" Olalia-Hizon (b. 1937), founder of Pampanga's Best
 Recto Mercene (b. 1943), photojournalist
 October 3 – Macario Duguiang (b. 1948), former governor of Kalinga
 October 7 – Henry Jones Ragas (b. 1933), radio announcer
 October 9 – Chito Gascon (b. 1964), chairman of the Commission on Human Rights
 October 10 – Ramon Barba (b. 1939), National Scientist of the Philippines
 October 12 – Ricardo S. Po Sr. (b. 1932), founder and former chairman of Century Pacific Food
 October 14 – Vic Sison (b. 1936), football player
 October 15:
 Nikosheen "D-CoY" On (b. 1977), hiphop artist
 Maximino Edralin Jr. (b. 1931), journalist and public relations consultant
 October 20 –  Felicisimo Vierneza (b. 1930), former mayor of San Pedro, Laguna (1972–1986; 1998–2007)
 October 29 – Dither Tablan (b. 1998), judo and kurash athlete
 October 30 – Romeo Gacad (b. 1959), photojournalist

November
 November 2 – Mar Lopez (b. 1936), singer
 November 6 – Didagen Dilangalen, former representative of Maguindanao's 1st congressional district
 November 11 – Freddie Lazarito (b. 1955), football coach
 November 16 – Heber Bartolome (b. 1948), musician
 November 17 - Eutiquio Bernales (b. 1936), physician, and the longest serving former mayor of Ubay, Bohol for 23 years.
 November 19 – Edgardo Labella (b. 1951), mayor of Cebu City
 November 21 – Bert de Leon (b. 1947), television director
 November 22 – Francisca Susano (b. 1897), supercentenarian

December
 December 10 – Romulo dela Cruz (b. 1947), archbishop of Zamboanga
 December 12 – Ariel Magcalas (b. 1965), former mayor of Santa Cruz, Laguna
 December 19 – Ato Badolato (b. 1946), basketball coach
 December 20 – Arlyn Dela Cruz (b. 1970), veteran broadcaster
 December 26 – Lawrence Chongson (b. 1964), basketball coach
 December 27 – Michael Gutierrez, mayor of Lopez Jaena, Misamis Occidental

See also

Country overviews 
 Philippines
 History of Philippines
 History of modern Philippines
 Outline of Philippines
 Government of Philippines
 Politics of Philippines
 Years in the Philippines
 Timeline of Philippine history

Related timelines for current period 
 2021
 2021 in politics and government
 2020s

References 

2021 in Southeast Asia
Philippines
 
2020s in the Philippines
Years of the 21st century in the Philippines